Israpil Velijanov (4 September 1968 – April 18, 2011), also known as Emir Hassan, was the militant leader of the Vilayat Dagestan of the Caucasus Emirate, in the volatile southern Russian republic of Dagestan following the death of Magomed Vagabov.

Biography
He was born September 4, 1968, in the village of Sanchi Kaitag in Dagestan. In 1998 Velijanov attended a military training camp in Chechnya ran by the field commander Khattab. He took part in the Invasion of Dagestan and the Second Chechen War.

He became the Emir of the Vilayat Dagestan from 30 August 2010 until his death on April 18, 2011, during a security operation near the village of Tashkapur in Dagestan.

References 

1968 births
2011 deaths
People from Dagestan
Russian Sunni Muslims
Russian Islamists
Caucasus Emirate members
Caucasian Front (militant group)
People of the Chechen wars
Russian rebels
Leaders of Islamic terror groups